On 4 June 2018, S. Rudhregowda was elected unopposed to the Karnataka Legislative Council. Out of 11 seats, the INC won 4 seats, JD(S) 2 and BJP 5.

References

Bharatiya Janata Party politicians from Karnataka
Year of birth missing (living people)
Living people